Professor Andrew Robert Korda AM (MA, MBBS, FRCOG, FRANZCOG, FACLM) is an Australian medical specialist obstetrician and gynecologist. He is a subspecialist in urogynaecology and in 2011 became a Member of the Order of Australia for his outstanding contributions to medicine.

Early life
Andrew Robert Korda was born to parents Tibor and Tereze Korda, who immigrated to Australia from Hungary in 1957. He attended Randwick Boys High School from 1957 - 1959 where he is listed as a notable alumnus.

Career
Following graduation in Medicine (MBBS) from the University of Sydney, Professor Korda did his specialist training in Obstetrics and Gynaecology at the Royal Prince Alfred Hospital in Sydney, with further training in Oxford, United Kingdom and New York City. During his career as a specialist Obstetrician and Gynaecologist, he has held positions as Senior Surgeon, Chairman, Senior Gynaecological Reviewer for Sentinel and Critical Events, Head of Department and Consultant Emeritus at leading hospitals, as well as treating patients in his own private practice and being an expert witness. He has also held senior research and teaching positions at universities and hospitals in several countries, including the position of Chief Examiner in Urogynaecology of the Royal Australian and New Zealand College of Obstetricians and Gynaecologists, Foundation Professor in Obstetrics and Gynaecology at Western Sydney University and is a Fellow of the Royal College of Obstetricians and Gynaecologists.

After studying at the Beth Israel Medical Center Urodynamic Unit, Professor Korda approached the administration at Royal Prince Alfred Hospital and received funding to set up a urodynamic unit, which he co-ordinated with the Departments of Urology and Radiology. This was the first urodynamic Unit set up outside Richard Millard's unit, operating from the X-ray department of what was then King George V Memorial Hospital.

As part of the Urodynamic Unit at Royal Prince Alfred Hospital in 1981, he became an accredited subspecialist in pelvic floor muscle disorder and reconstructive pelvic surgery in 1989. By recognising the prevalence of bladder and pelvic floor issues amongst women, and the importance of treatment based on specific and accurate diagnosis, Korda became a founding partner of the Sydney Urodynamic Centre in 1980.

He has received master's degrees in both Art and Health Law from the University of Sydney and is currently a guest speaker, Consultant Emeritus at the Royal Prince Alfred Hospital, Trustee of the Australian Bladder Foundation and Conjoint Professor in Obstetrics and Gynaecology at Western Sydney University.

Awards
Member of the Order of Australia
Mabel Elizabeth Leaver Prize for Obstetrics
Aisling Memorial Society Prize
Chenhall Travelling Fellow in Gynaecology
Searle Travelling Fellowship

Personal life
Professor Korda has an interest in classical music and is a patron of the Sydney Symphony Orchestra. He is also a collector of Australian, South East Asian and Aboriginal art.

Selected publications
Professor Korda has contributed substantially to education and training and is the author of 104 original articles

Some examples are listed below:
Korda, Andrew R., et al. "Assessment of possible luteolytic effect of intra-ovarian injection of prostaglandin F 2α in the human." Prostaglandins 9.3 (1975): 443-449.
Korda, Andrew, et al. "The value of clinical symptoms in the diagnosis of urinary incontinence in the female." Australian and New Zealand Journal of Obstetrics and Gynaecology 27.2 (1987): 149-151.
Korda, Andrew, Brian Peat, and Peter Hunter. "Experience with silastic slings for female urinary incontinence." Australian and New Zealand Journal of Obstetrics and Gynaecology 29.2 (1989): 150-154.
Kesby, Gregory J. & Andrew R. Korda. "Migration of a Filshie clip into the urinary bladder seven years after laparoscopic sterilisation." BJOG: An International Journal of Obstetrics & Gynaecology 104.3 (1997): 379-382.
Dietz, Hans Peter & Andrew Korda. "Which bowel symptoms are most strongly associated with as rectocele?." Australian and New Zealand journal of obstetrics and gynaecology 45.6 (2005): 505-508.
Korda, Andrew. "Where to with treatment of pelvic organ prolapse in 2014?."Medicine Today 14.5 (2014): 63-67.

References

External links
Medicine Today article
LinkedIn profile
ResearchGate profile
Sydney Urodynamic Centres publication list
Sydney Morning Herald article

Year of birth missing (living people)
Living people
Australian gynaecologists
Members of the Order of Australia